Icefall is a book written by Matthew J. Kirby and published by Scholastic Press on 1 October 2011 which later went on to win the Edgar Award for Best Juvenile in 2012.

Plot summary
The novel is set in medieval Norway. When the king goes to war, he sends his three children to a remote steading for protection. His oldest daughter Asa, the middle child, Solveig, who begins to learn the art of storytelling from the king's skald, and the youngest child and heir to the throne Harold. During a frightening winter, the household has to deal with food shortages and the mystery of a murderous traitor.

References

External links

2011 American novels
2011 children's books
American young adult novels
Children's historical novels
Children's mystery novels
Edgar Award-winning works
Novels set in Norway
Novels set in the Viking Age
Scholastic Corporation books